The Verdun Auditorium is an arena located in the borough of Verdun, in Montreal, Quebec, Canada. The building was constructed in 1938 and holds 4,114 seats. The largest arena in the west end of Montreal, the complex is also home to Arena Denis Savard, a small minor-hockey rink, attached to its side. The Auditorium has hosted various Quebec Major Junior Hockey League teams, including the Verdun Juniors, Verdun Éperviers and Verdun Collège Français. In 1993, it also hosted the Montreal Dragons for its lone season in the short lived National Basketball League. It was slated to become the home arena of Les Canadiennes de Montréal in 2019, but was cancelled due to CWHL folding on May 1.

On January 25, 2008, the QMJHL approved the sale of the St. John's Fog Devils to Montreal businessman Farrel Miller, who relocated the team to Montreal, where it was known as the Montreal Junior Hockey Club. In Summer 2011, the team moved to Boisbriand to become the Blainville-Boisbriand Armada.

The auditorium also received the American grunge band Nirvana on November 2, 1993. This was the band's last show in Montreal before frontman Kurt Cobain died five months later.

The Verdun Auditorium has also hosted professional wrestling events, including shows promoted by Johnny Rougeau's All Star Wrestling, the Vachon Brothers' Grand Prix Wrestling and Lutte Internationale, and was the location of the first World Wrestling Federation event to be held in Montreal, though that event drew poorly against the better-established Lutte Internationale.

Major upgrades of the arena were undertaken in 2018 with plans for completion in 2020. These $42 million renovations will see upgrades to the safety of the facility, as well as a restoration of the brick façade.

In May 2022, it hosted the first home game of the Montreal Alliance of the Canadian Elite Basketball League. The Alliance won 80-70 over the Scarborough Shooting Stars in front of a near-sell out crowd.

References

External links
 Verdun Auditorium - City of Montreal
 QMJHL Arena & Travel Guide

Indoor arenas in Quebec
Indoor ice hockey venues in Canada
Quebec Major Junior Hockey League arenas
Sports venues in Montreal
Verdun, Quebec
Sports venues completed in 1939
1939 establishments in Quebec